Letters Home is a 1986 studio album by English avant-rock group News from Babel. It was recorded at Tim Hodgkinson's Cold Storage Recording Studios in Brixton, London, in 1985 and 1986, and was released in 1986. It was their second album and included guest vocalists Robert Wyatt, Dagmar Krause, Sally Potter and Phil Minton. Krause (no longer a member of the group) was listed here as a guest and only sang on two songs.

Picking up where Work Resumed on the Tower left off, Letters Home continues News from Babel's exploration of "Marxist politics and personal alienation" set to a blend of rock, jazz and cabaret. The music on the album was composed by Lindsay Cooper and the song texts were written by Chris Cutler. The album's title was named after Letters Home, a collection of letters written by Sylvia Plath.

For technical reasons, the original LP release of this album was pressed on a 12" disc at 45 rpm, and not the standard 33⅓ rpm.

Track listing

Personnel
Lindsay Cooper – bassoon, sopranino and alto saxophone, piano, other keyboards
Chris Cutler – drums, electrics, percussion
Zeena Parkins – harp, prepared and electric harps, accordion, e-bow guitar

Guests
Bill Gilonis – bass guitar, guitar
Robert Wyatt – singing ("Who Will Accuse?", "Heart of Stone", "Moss", "Waited/Justice", "Late Evening")
Dagmar Krause – singing ("Fast Food", "Late Evening")
Sally Potter – singing ("Banknote", "Dark Matter")
Phil Minton – singing ("Dragon at the Core")

CD reissues
In 1990 Recommended Records re-issued Letters Home and News from Babel's previous album, Work Resumed on the Tower on a single CD.
In 2006 Recommended Records issued a remastered version of Letters Home on CD.
In 2006 Recommended Records released a News from Babel box set, Complete comprising remastered versions of Work Resumed on the Tower, Letters Home and the band's only single, "Contraries".

References

External links

1986 albums
Recommended Records albums
News from Babel albums